During the early 2000s, displacement of minorities in Portland, Oregon, occurred at a drastic rate. Out of 29 census tracts in north and northeast Portland, ten were majority nonwhite in 2000. By 2010, none of these tracts were majority nonwhite as gentrification drove the cost of living up. Today, Portland's Black community is concentrated in the north and northeast section of the city, mainly in the King neighborhood. In 2017, Portland, Oregon was named the fourth fastest gentrifying city in the United States by Realtor.com. At least one author has ascribed the "urban containment" effect on rising housing prices to Portland's urban growth boundary.

See also

 Gentrification of Atlanta
 Gentrification of Chicago
 Gentrification in Philadelphia
 Gentrification of San Francisco
 Gentrification of Vancouver

References

External links
 
 
 
 

African-American history in Portland, Oregon
Portland
Housing in Oregon